Bad Schwanberg is a market town in the Austrian state of Styria, in the district of Deutschlandsberg. It is situated on the eastern slopes of the Koralpe mountain range on the river Schwarze Sulm (Black Sulm), a major tributary of the river Sulm.

Schwanberg was expanded as part of the Styria municipal structural reform, at the end of 2014, by merging with the former municipalities Hollenegg, Gressenberg and Garanas, but continuing with the name "Schwanberg" until it was finally renamed "Bad Schwanberg" from 1 March 2020.

People from Bad Schwanberg 
 Wilhelm Gericke (1845-1925), conductor

Population in town as of 2015

References

External links

Cities and towns in Deutschlandsberg District
Spa towns in Austria